Maggie Tallerman is a professor of linguistics at Newcastle University. Her research interests include Celtic linguistics, language origins and evolution (evolutionary linguistics), language typology, morphology and morphosyntax. She is a leading expert in the fields of language evolution and syntax of the Welsh language.

Education 
Tallerman gained her PhD from the University of Hull in 1987 on the ‘Mutation and the syntactic structure of Modern Colloquial Welsh’ under the supervisor Nigel B Vincent. She gained her B.A. (Hons) in 1979 in linguistics, also at the University of Hull.

Career 
Tallerman has previously held positions at the University of Durham, Department of Linguistics, as Lecturer, Senior Lecturer and Reader (1982-2004).

Tallerman's research interests include Celtic linguistics, language origins and evolution. Her particular interests include Brythonic Celtic and Language Evolution.

Publications 
Her works include:
 2015 Understanding Syntax published by Routledge.
 2012 with Kathleen Gibson, editor The Oxford Handbook of Language Evolution.
 2007 with Robert D. Borsley and David Willis. The Syntax of Welsh. Cambridge: Cambridge University Press, 2007.
 Tallerman, Maggie. VSO word order and consonantal mutation in Welsh. Linguistics 1990, 28, 389–416.

Memberships 
 EVOLANG - The International Conferences on the Evolution of Language: http://www.evolang.org/
 Linguistics Association of Great Britain 
 Linguistic Society of America 
 Philological Society

References

External links

Linguists from the United Kingdom
Women linguists
Academics of Newcastle University
Living people
Alumni of the University of Hull
Academics of Durham University
Year of birth missing (living people)